The Windeckkopf, sometimes called the Windeck, is a mountain, 1,209 metres high, in the Southern Black Forest in the municipality of Hinterzarten in the county of Breisgau-Hochschwarzwald in the German state of Baden-Württemberg.

One-thousanders of Germany
Mountains and hills of the Black Forest
Breisgau-Hochschwarzwald
Baden